This was the first edition of the tournament, organised with a single-year license in 2021.

Hailey Baptiste and Caty McNally won the title, defeating Ellen Perez and Storm Sanders in the final, 6–7(4–7), 6–4, [10–6]. This was Baptiste's first WTA doubles title.

Seeds

Draw

Draw

References

External links
Main Draw

2021 WTA Tour
2021 MUSC Health Women's Open - 2